Richard Douglas Canary (born in 1962) is an American mathematician working mainly on low-dimensional topology. He is a professor at the University of Michigan.

Canary obtained his Ph.D. from Princeton University in 1989 under the supervision of William Paul Thurston, with the thesis Hyperbolic Structures on 3-Manifolds with Compressible Boundaries.

He received a Sloan Research Fellowship in 1993.

In 2015 he became a fellow of the American Mathematical Society, "for contributions to low-dimensional topology and hyperbolic geometry as well as for service and teaching in mathematics."

References

External links
Canary's home page at the University of Michigan
Canary's profile at Google Scholar

20th-century American mathematicians
1962 births
Princeton University alumni
University of Michigan faculty
Sloan Research Fellows
Fellows of the American Mathematical Society
Topologists
Living people
Geometers
21st-century American mathematicians